Metarctia johanna is a moth of the subfamily Arctiinae. It was described by Sergius G. Kiriakoff in 1979. It is found in Nigeria.

References

 

Endemic fauna of Nigeria
Metarctia
Moths described in 1979